The 2015–16 Bangladesh Championship League (also known as Minister Fridge Bangladesh Championship League 2015–16 for sponsorship reasons). Season begun in November 2015, ended in January 2016 and was won by Uttar Baridhara SC.

Standings

References

External links
 Minister Fridge Bangladesh Championship League 2014–15
 Bangladesh Championship League 2015/16

Bangladesh Championship League seasons
2015–16 in Asian association football leagues
2015 in Bangladeshi football
2016 in Bangladeshi football